Ari-Pekka Nikkola (born 16 May 1969) is a Finnish former ski jumper.

Career
He won two gold medals in the Team large hill competition at the 1988 Winter Olympics in Calgary and the 1992 Winter Olympics in Albertville. His best individual finish was a 15th place in the Individual normal hill at the 1998 Winter Olympics in Nagano.

His biggest successes were at the FIS Nordic World Ski Championships, where he won seven medals. This included four golds (Team large hill: 1987, 1989, 1995, and 1997), two silver (Individual normal hill: 1989, Team large hill: 1991), and one bronze (Individual normal hill: 1991).

World Cup

Standings

Wins

External links
 
 

 

1969 births
Living people
People from Kuopio
Finnish male ski jumpers
Ski jumpers at the 1988 Winter Olympics
Ski jumpers at the 1992 Winter Olympics
Ski jumpers at the 1994 Winter Olympics
Ski jumpers at the 1998 Winter Olympics
Olympic ski jumpers of Finland
Olympic gold medalists for Finland
Olympic medalists in ski jumping
FIS Nordic World Ski Championships medalists in ski jumping
Medalists at the 1988 Winter Olympics
Medalists at the 1992 Winter Olympics
Sportspeople from North Savo